The 2012–13 NBB season was the fifth edition of Novo Basquete Brasil, the Brazilian basketball league. This tournament is organized entirely by the Liga Nacional de Basquete (LNB). The NBB serves as a qualifying competition for international tournaments such as Liga Sudamericana and Torneo InterLigas. For this season the qualify for the FIBA Americas League came to be through the Liga Sudamericana.

This season has a record number of participating teams, with eighteen teams playing each other in round and second round in the regular season. At the end of two rounds the top four teams qualify for the quarterfinals of the playoffs automatically, while the teams finishing in the 5th and 12th place participated in the first round of the playoffs to determine the other four teams in the quarterfinals, best of five matches, advances to the next phase who win three games.

For this season, the LNB added a new feature: the last two regular season placed will dispute a four-group against the two finalists in the Super Copa Brasil de Basquete. The two top finishers in this group receive the right to contest the next NBB.

Participating teams

Managerial changes

Regular season

League table
{| class="wikitable" style="text-align: center;"
! width=20| # !! width=180|Teams !! width=20| !! width=20| !! width=20| !! width=35| !! width=35| !! width=35| !! width=35| !! width=35| !! Qualification or relegation
|- bgcolor=ACE1AF
|1||align="left"|Flamengo || 34 || 30 || 4 || 3088 || 2585 || 1,20 || 88% || 64
|rowspan=4 align="center"|Qualified for the Quarterfinals Playoffs
|- bgcolor=ACE1AF
|2||align="left"|Brasília || 34 || 27 || 7 || 3037 || 2712 || 1,12 || 79% || 61
|- bgcolor=ACE1AF
|3||align="left"|Uberlândia || 34 || 25 || 9 || 2855 || 2631 || 1,09 || 73% || 59
|- bgcolor=ACE1AF
|4||align="left"|Bauru || 34 || 24 || 10 || 2817 || 2608 || 1,08 || 70% || 58
|- bgcolor=D0F0C0
|5||align="left"|Franca || 34 || 23 || 11 || 2673 || 2422 || 1,10 || 67% || 57
|rowspan=8 align="center"|Qualified for the First Round Playoffs
|- bgcolor=D0F0C0
|6||align="left"|Pinheiros || 34 || 22 || 12 || 2941 || 2825 || 1,04 || 64% || 56
|- bgcolor=D0F0C0
|7||align="left"|São José || 34 || 20 || 14 || 2721 || 2653 || 1,03 || 58% || 54
|- bgcolor=D0F0C0
|8||align="left"|Basquete Cearense || 34 || 18 || 16 || 2727 || 2721 || 1,00 || 52% || 52
|- bgcolor=D0F0C0
|9||align="left"|Paulistano || 34 || 17 || 17 || 2740 || 2745 || 1,00 || 50% || 51
|- bgcolor=D0F0C0
|10||align="left"|Minas || 34 || 16 || 18 || 2750 || 2779 || 0,99 || 47% || 50
|- bgcolor=D0F0C0
|11||align="left"|Limeira || 34 || 15 || 19 || 2748 || 2691 || 1,02 || 44% || 49
|- bgcolor=D0F0C0
|12||align="left"|Liga Sorocabana || 34 || 15 || 19 || 2640 || 2746 || 0,96 || 44% || 49
|- 
|13||align="left"|Palmeiras || 34 || 12 || 22 || 2562 || 2742 || 0,93 || 35% || 46
|- 
|14||align="left"|Mogi das Cruzes || 34 || 11 || 23 || 2546 || 2796 || 0,91 || 32% || 45
|- 
|15||align="left"|Joinville || 34 || 11 || 23 || 2579 || 2739 || 0,94 || 32% || 45
|- 
|16||align="left"|Vila Velha || 34 || 10 || 24 || 2690 || 2899 || 0,93 || 29% || 44
|- bgcolor=FFCCCC
|17||align="left"|Tijuca || 34 || 6 || 28 || 2447 || 2706 || 0,90 || 17% || 40
|rowspan=2 align="center"| Relegation to Promotion Tournament
|- bgcolor=FFCCCC
|18||align="left"|Suzano || 34 || 4 || 30 || 2497 || 3064 || 0,82 || 11% || 38 
|-

Results
{| style="font-size: 85%; text-align: center" class="wikitable"
|-
| width=150|
| align="center" width=45|BCE
| width=45|BAU
| width=45|BRA
| width=45|FLA
| width=45|FRA
| width=45|JOI
| width=45|LSB
| width=45|LIM
| width=45|MIN
| width=45|MOG
| width=45|PAL
| width=45|PAU
| width=45|PIN
| width=45|SJO
| width=45|SUZ
| width=45|TIJ
| width=45|UBE
| width=45|VIV
|-
|align=left|Basquete Cearense
| style="background:#ccc;"|
| style="background:#cfc;"|83–82
| style="background:#fcc;"|100–104
| style="background:#fcc;"|82–101
| style="background:#fcc;"|87–88
| style="background:#cfc;"|78–62
| style="background:#cfc;"|71–62
| style="background:#fcc;"|65–84
| style="background:#cfc;"|88–52
| style="background:#fcc;"|71–74
| style="background:#cfc;"|85–83
| style="background:#cfc;"|95–76
| style="background:#fcc;"|84–85
| style="background:#cfc;"|73–63
| style="background:#cfc;"|96–61
| style="background:#cfc;"|92–86
| style="background:#fcc;"|60–72
| style="background:#cfc;"|77–75
|-
|align=left|Bauru
| style="background:#cfc;"|95–84
| style="background:#ccc;"|
| style="background:#fcc;"|79–90
| style="background:#fcc;"|97–102
| style="background:#fcc;"|67–74
| style="background:#cfc;"|114–91
| style="background:#fcc;"|85–94
| style="background:#cfc;"|83–82
| style="background:#cfc;"|91–59
| style="background:#cfc;"|87–84
| style="background:#cfc;"|91–67
| style="background:#cfc;"|66–64
| style="background:#cfc;"|67–62
| style="background:#cfc;"|87–82
| style="background:#cfc;"|85–44
| style="background:#cfc;"|81–68
| style="background:#fcc;"|81–82
| style="background:#cfc;"|85–70
|-
|align=left|Brasília
| style="background:#cfc;"|92–77
| style="background:#cfc;"|80–60
| style="background:#ccc;"|
| style="background:#cfc;"|82–70
| style="background:#cfc;"|93–77
| style="background:#cfc;"|94–83
| style="background:#cfc;"|86–75
| style="background:#cfc;"|97–89
| style="background:#fcc;"|81–86
| style="background:#cfc;"|94–67
| style="background:#cfc;"|99–81
| style="background:#cfc;"|68–67
| style="background:#fcc;"|96–99
| style="background:#cfc;"|90–57
| style="background:#cfc;"|94–82
| style="background:#cfc;"|90–79
| style="background:#cfc;"|102–80
| style="background:#cfc;"|102–76
|-
|align=left|Flamengo
| style="background:#cfc;"|86–61
| style="background:#fcc;"|74–89
| style="background:#cfc;"|102–88
| style="background:#ccc;"|
| style="background:#fcc;"|86–91
| style="background:#cfc;"|94–67
| style="background:#cfc;"|102–64
| style="background:#cfc;"|98–81
| style="background:#cfc;"|90–77
| style="background:#cfc;"|70–64
| style="background:#cfc;"|81–61
| style="background:#cfc;"|94–70
| style="background:#cfc;"|102–85
| style="background:#cfc;"|83–75
| style="background:#cfc;"|89–56
| style="background:#cfc;"|107–103
| style="background:#cfc;"|79–66
| style="background:#cfc;"|96–77
|-
|align=left|Franca
| style="background:#cfc;"|90–68
| style="background:#fcc;"|80–82
| style="background:#fcc;"|62–76
| style="background:#fcc;"|77–82
| style="background:#ccc;"|
| style="background:#cfc;"|70–52
| style="background:#cfc;"|85–64
| style="background:#cfc;"|75–62
| style="background:#cfc;"|78–77
| style="background:#cfc;"|79–71
| style="background:#cfc;"|82–61
| style="background:#cfc;"|77–63
| style="background:#cfc;"|72–67
| style="background:#cfc;"|76–53
| style="background:#cfc;"|108–66
| style="background:#cfc;"|101–75
| style="background:#fcc;"|73–75
| style="background:#cfc;"|96–86
|-
|align=left|Joinville
| style="background:#cfc;"|94–71
| style="background:#fcc;"|71–83
| style="background:#fcc;"|86–96
| style="background:#fcc;"|72–99
| style="background:#fcc;"|50–59
| style="background:#ccc;"|
| style="background:#fcc;"|86–93
| style="background:#cfc;"|77–62
| style="background:#cfc;"|73–55
| style="background:#fcc;"|85–90
| style="background:#cfc;"|75–60
| style="background:#fcc;"|63–71
| style="background:#fcc;"|73–93
| style="background:#fcc;"|79–93
| style="background:#cfc;"|79–67
| style="background:#cfc;"|74–73
| style="background:#cfc;"|71–62
| style="background:#cfc;"|99–80
|-
|align=left|Liga Sorocabana
| style="background:#fcc;"|76–86
| style="background:#fcc;"|76–90
| style="background:#fcc;"|70–100
| style="background:#fcc;"|59–87
| style="background:#fcc;"|59–80
| style="background:#cfc;"|93–86
| style="background:#ccc;"|
| style="background:#cfc;"|81–79
| style="background:#fcc;"|82–84
| style="background:#cfc;"|81–74
| style="background:#cfc;"|93–73
| style="background:#fcc;"|73–78
| style="background:#fcc;"|81–87
| style="background:#cfc;"|66–65
| style="background:#cfc;"|87–70
| style="background:#cfc;"|72–67
| style="background:#cfc;"|74–63
| style="background:#cfc;"|82–76
|-
|align=left|Limeira
| style="background:#cfc;"|90–72
| style="background:#fcc;"|82–84
| style="background:#fcc;"|77–80
| style="background:#fcc;"|75–80
| style="background:#cfc;"|72–58
| style="background:#cfc;"|96–86
| style="background:#cfc;"|85–66
| style="background:#ccc;"|
| style="background:#fcc;"|85–87
| style="background:#fcc;"|71–79
| style="background:#cfc;"|75–65
| style="background:#cfc;"|89–68
| style="background:#cfc;"|82–81
| style="background:#fcc;"|79–83
| style="background:#cfc;"|96–65
| style="background:#cfc;"|91–75
| style="background:#fcc;"|77–87
| style="background:#cfc;"|88–87
|-
|align=left|Minas
| style="background:#cfc;"|76–74
| style="background:#fcc;"|64–77
| style="background:#fcc;"|86–90
| style="background:#fcc;"|90–105
| style="background:#fcc;"|58–60
| style="background:#cfc;"|78–69
| style="background:#cfc;"|78–76
| style="background:#cfc;"|81–61
| style="background:#ccc;"|
| style="background:#fcc;"|84–86
| style="background:#cfc;"|89–77
| style="background:#fcc;"|109–114
| style="background:#cfc;"|101–75
| style="background:#cfc;"|97–77
| style="background:#cfc;"|100–78
| style="background:#cfc;"|77–70
| style="background:#fcc;"|67–90
| style="background:#cfc;"|95–72
|-
|align=left|Mogi das Cruzes
| style="background:#fcc;"|80–86
| style="background:#fcc;"|73–80
| style="background:#fcc;"|91–96
| style="background:#fcc;"|64–86
| style="background:#fcc;"|59–95
| style="background:#fcc;"|68–70
| style="background:#cfc;"|71–59
| style="background:#fcc;"|72–89
| style="background:#cfc;"|75–66
| style="background:#ccc;"|
| style="background:#cfc;"|78–75
| style="background:#cfc;"|77–73
| style="background:#fcc;"|76–95
| style="background:#fcc;"|60–93
| style="background:#cfc;"|86–65
| style="background:#fcc;"|68–83
| style="background:#cfc;"|83–81
| style="background:#fcc;"|76–85
|-
|align=left|Palmeiras
| style="background:#fcc;"|81–86
| style="background:#cfc;"|89–83
| style="background:#fcc;"|78–88
| style="background:#fcc;"|61–106
| style="background:#cfc;"|87–77
| style="background:#cfc;"|92–86
| style="background:#cfc;"|85–77
| style="background:#cfc;"|72–68
| style="background:#cfc;"|96–87
| style="background:#cfc;"|86–77
| style="background:#ccc;"|
| style="background:#fcc;"|79–86
| style="background:#fcc;"|85–94
| style="background:#cfc;"|75–66
| style="background:#cfc;"|95–86
| style="background:#fcc;"|77–79
| style="background:#cfc;"|112–104
| style="background:#cfc;"|87–65
|-
|align=left|Paulistano
| style="background:#fcc;"|79–86
| style="background:#cfc;"|76–73
| style="background:#fcc;"|77–82
| style="background:#fcc;"|93–94
| style="background:#fcc;"|51–77
| style="background:#cfc;"|95–71
| style="background:#fcc;"|94–96
| style="background:#cfc;"|86–82
| style="background:#cfc;"|92–78
| style="background:#fcc;"|67–77
| style="background:#cfc;"|83–69
| style="background:#ccc;"|
| style="background:#cfc;"|89–88
| style="background:#cfc;"|80–68
| style="background:#cfc;"|84–72
| style="background:#cfc;"|84–65
| style="background:#fcc;"|76–88
| style="background:#fcc;"|80–90
|-
|align=left|Pinheiros
| style="background:#cfc;"|87–69
| style="background:#fcc;"|73–74
| style="background:#cfc;"|92–89
| style="background:#cfc;"|93–91
| style="background:#cfc;"|97–82
| style="background:#cfc;"|88–87
| style="background:#fcc;"|77–94
| style="background:#cfc;"|102–100
| style="background:#cfc;"|91–77
| style="background:#cfc;"|118–82
| style="background:#cfc;"|87–82
| style="background:#cfc;"|88–86
| style="background:#ccc;"|
| style="background:#fcc;"|77–82
| style="background:#cfc;"|91–65
| style="background:#cfc;"|84–81
| style="background:#fcc;"|87–92
| style="background:#cfc;"|92–90
|-
|align=left|São José
| style="background:#fcc;"|76–87
| style="background:#fcc;"|62–82
| style="background:#cfc;"|84–79
| style="background:#fcc;"|82–84
| style="background:#cfc;"|87–66
| style="background:#cfc;"|83–76
| style="background:#cfc;"|77–73
| style="background:#cfc;"|84–76
| style="background:#cfc;"|95–93
| style="background:#cfc;"|105–67
| style="background:#cfc;"|77–65
| style="background:#fcc;"|68–76
| style="background:#cfc;"|93–77
| style="background:#ccc;"|
| style="background:#cfc;"|89–74
| style="background:#cfc;"|81–65
| style="background:#cfc;"|80–76
| style="background:#cfc;"|106–87
|-
|align=left|Suzano
| style="background:#fcc;"|71–85
| style="background:#fcc;"|82–87
| style="background:#fcc;"|81–92
| style="background:#fcc;"|74–105
| style="background:#cfc;"|75–71
| style="background:#fcc;"|65–75
| style="background:#fcc;"|79–90
| style="background:#fcc;"|80–81
| style="background:#fcc;"|76–97
| style="background:#cfc;"|78–77
| style="background:#fcc;"|79–87
| style="background:#fcc;"|85–87
| style="background:#fcc;"|72–91
| style="background:#fcc;"|80–100
| style="background:#ccc;"|
| style="background:#cfc;"|86–79
| style="background:#fcc;"|67–89
| style="background:#fcc;"|88–94
|-
|align=left|Tijuca
| style="background:#fcc;"|69–83
| style="background:#fcc;"|71–79
| style="background:#fcc;"|53–73
| style="background:#fcc;"|70–94
| style="background:#fcc;"|59–63
| style="background:#fcc;"|58–79
| style="background:#fcc;"|68–89
| style="background:#fcc;"|77–82
| style="background:#fcc;"|65–75
| style="background:#cfc;"|76–67
| style="background:#cfc;"|82–79
| style="background:#fcc;"|52–74
| style="background:#fcc;"|64–73
| style="background:#fcc;"|74–79
| style="background:#cfc;"|103–66
| style="background:#ccc;"|
| style="background:#fcc;"|63–83
| style="background:#cfc;"|82–74
|-
|align=left|Uberlândia
| style="background:#cfc;"|84–71
| style="background:#cfc;"|94–83
| style="background:#cfc;"|95–89
| style="background:#fcc;"|78–87
| style="background:#cfc;"|91–87
| style="background:#cfc;"|99–73
| style="background:#cfc;"|84–81
| style="background:#fcc;"|86–96
| style="background:#cfc;"|88–86
| style="background:#cfc;"|75–68
| style="background:#cfc;"|89–73
| style="background:#cfc;"|86–75
| style="background:#cfc;"|91–87
| style="background:#cfc;"|88–63
| style="background:#cfc;"|109–73
| style="background:#cfc;"|71–57
| style="background:#ccc;"|
| style="background:#cfc;"|73–64
|-
|align=left|Vila Velha
| style="background:#fcc;"|85–94
| style="background:#fcc;"|79–88
| style="background:#cfc;"|94–85
| style="background:#fcc;"|61–82
| style="background:#fcc;"|64–87
| style="background:#cfc;"|67–59
| style="background:#cfc;"|88–82
| style="background:#cfc;"|72–64
| style="background:#fcc;"|82–84
| style="background:#cfc;"|92–85
| style="background:#cfc;"|68–59
| style="background:#fcc;"|120–126
| style="background:#fcc;"|74–78
| style="background:#fcc;"|86–93
| style="background:#fcc;"|86–89
| style="background:#cfc;"|58–56
| style="background:#fcc;"|66–84
| style="background:#ccc;"|
|-

NBB All-Star Weekend 
This season, the All-Star Weekend will be played in Ginásio Nilson Nelson in Brasília on March 1–2, 2013. In the first day of the event, it will be disputed the "Dunk Tournament", "Three-Point Tournament" and "Skills Challenge". In these three tournaments, the champions in the previous season are already included, while the other participating players will compete for the remaining spots. The players of Brasília, the host team, are also included at these tournaments.

In the second day, it will occur the main event on the weekend, the NBB All-Star Game, which will be disputed by two teams divided into "NBB Brasil", formed by Brazilian players, and "NBB Mundo", formed by foreign players.  On February 6, the Liga Nacional de Basquete (LNB) announced the players that will make up the teams NBB Brasil and NBB Mundo, which will compete in the fifth edition of the All-Star Game of the national competition. In all, 85 votes were counted. Different professionals who participated in the election had assigned different weights. The coaches of the 18 teams vying for the NBB accounted for 50%, the captains of the teams were left with 20%, while the specialist press and the personalities of basketball had 30% weight. The starter players will be chosen by votes on the internet.

Dunk Tournament 
For Dunk Tournament, the champion in the previous season was the shooting guard Gui Deodato, from Bauru, while the host team, Brasília, will be represented by the shooting guard Isaac Gonçalves. The other challengers to the title was defined after being evaluated by a jury of personalities from the artistic and basketball. The judges evaluated each participant a dunk and choose two athletes (Danilo Fuzaro and Jefferson Socas). The fifth element (Desmond Holloway) was set after a popular vote on the Internet. The two finalists were the champion of the previous season Gui Deodato and the shooting guard Danilo Fuzaro. Using the cover of the character Batman and a mask of the famous villain Darth Vader, Gui Deodato won the tournament.

Three-Point Tournament 
The tournament will have six competitors for the title. The champion of previous season Helinho, from Uberlândia, and Rossi, from the host city team, had already been secured in the dispute and its four rivals was decided after the completion of qualifying, which was played between matches of the NBB on February 14 and February 16. In the final, which featured Matheus Dalla, from Limeira, and Matheus Costa, from Basquete Cearense, it was necessary two tiebreaks to know the champion. In the second tiebreak Matheus Dalla won his first Three-Point Tournament.

Skills Challenge 
The Skills Challenge, which will be played for the third time, will have the presence of double champion Fernando Penna, from Pinheiros, the guard Eric Tatu, from the host team Brasília, and six more competitors which was determined by the LNB Technical Department. In the final, Fernando Penna, for the third consecutive time, won the challenge, against the point guard Gustavinho, Mogi das Cruzes.

NBB All-Star Game 
On February 25, the election on the Internet finished, and the starter players were defined, according to the official site of NBB All-Star Game.

Jeff Agba, from Bauru, was originally selected to take part in the NBB Mundo team, but he injured and was replaced by Tyrone Curnell, from Palmeiras, while Guilherme Giovannoni, from Brasília, also was taken out of the game because of damage in his thigh, and for his place was named Jefferson William, from São José.

Roster

1Replacing Guilherme Giovannoni (30.9%)

2Replacing Jeff Agba (38.2%)

Game

Playoffs

First round

(5) Franca vs. (12) Liga Sorocabana 

Game 1

Game 2

Game 3

(6) Pinheiros vs. (11) Limeira 

Game 1

Game 2

Game 3

Game 4

Game 5

(7) São José vs. (10) Minas 

Game 1

Game 2

Game 3

Game 4

(8) Basquete Cearense vs. (9) Paulistano 

Game 1

Game 2

Game 3

Game 4

Game 5

Quarterfinals

(1) Flamengo vs. (9) Paulistano 

Game 1

Game 2

Game 3

(2) Brasília vs. (7) São José 

Game 1

Game 2

Game 3

Game 4

Game 5

(3) Uberlândia vs. (6) Pinheiros 

Game 1

Game 2

Game 3

Game 4

Game 5

(4) Bauru vs. (5) Franca 

Game 1

Game 2

Game 3

Game 4

Game 5

Semifinals

(1) Flamengo vs. (7) São José 

Game 1

Game 2

Game 3

Game 4

Game 5

(3) Uberlândia vs. (4) Bauru 

Game 1

Game 2

Game 3

Final

Promotion Tournament 
During the NBB semifinals, Tijuca, the penultimate placed in the regular season in the NBB (the last placed Suzano later withdrawn due to financial troubles), as well as Fluminense and Macaé, the two finalists of the Super Copa Brasil de Basquete, played a small tournament between them to decide the two teams that would join the other sixteen teams in the 2013–14 NBB season. All matches were played in the Ginásio Álvaro Vieira Lima, Rio de Janeiro.

After two rounds, Tijuca remained in NBB with two wins and Macaé was promoted to his first season.

Game 1

Game 2

Game 3

Statistical leaders

Individual tournament highs

Points

Rebounds

Assists

Blocks

Steals

Efficiency

Awards

NBB All-Team

Individual awards 

 MVP – Marquinhos (Flamengo)
 MVP of the Final – Caio Torres (Flamengo)
 Sixth Player – Léo Meindl (Franca)
 Best Defender – Alex Garcia (Brasília)
 Revelation – Ricardo Fischer (Bauru)
 Most Improved Player – Gui Deodato (Bauru)
 Coach – Lula Ferreira (Franca)

References

External links

 

2012-13
NBB